Gandhwan is a village near Hadiabad, Tehsil Phagwara, Kapurthala district, in Punjab, India.

Demographics
According to the 2001 Census, Gandhwan has a population of 1,385 people. The village has .  Neighbouring villages include Mehtan, Narangpur, Dhak Narangshahpur, Narangshahpur, Athouli, and Hardaspur.

The village has a number of families with the Jatt caste and with the surname 'Gandham'.

The village has a Gurudwara, the shrine of Baba Ghiri Ji, a bank and a primary school.

References

Villages in Kapurthala district